{{nihongo|Imabashi Station|今橋駅|Imabashi is a passenger railway station located in the city of Takamatsu, Kagawa, Japan.  It is operated by the private transportation company Takamatsu-Kotohira Electric Railroad (Kotoden) and is designated station "S01".

Lines
Imabashi Station is a station of the Kotoden Shido Line and is located 0.6 km from the opposing terminus of the line at Kawaramachi Station].

Layout
The station consists of two opposed side platforms. The station building is next to the eastbound platform. A level crossing connects the two platforms together.

Platforms

Adjacent stations

History
Kotoden-Yashima Station opened on November 11, 1918 on the Tosan Electric Tramway. On November 1, 1943 it became a station on the Takamatsu-Kotohira Electric Railway. Two trains collided head on at the station on August 1, 1976, with 210 people injured.

Surrounding area
Takamatsu Children's Museum of the Future
Takamatsu City Yumemirai Library
Kagawa Prefectural Takamatsu Commercial High School

See also
 List of railway stations in Japan

References

External links

  

Railway stations in Takamatsu
Railway stations in Japan opened in 1918
Stations of Takamatsu-Kotohira Electric Railroad